Viktor Grigorievich Kuzkin (July 6, 1940 – June 24, 2008) was an ice hockey defender who played in the Soviet Hockey League.  He played for HC CSKA Moscow. He was inducted into the Russian and Soviet Hockey Hall of Fame in 1963. He was born in Moscow, Soviet Union.

Kuzkin won three gold medals in ice hockey at the Winter Olympics, winning them from 1964 to 1972.

He died after suffering a heart attack whilst diving in Sochi, Russia.

References

1940 births
2008 deaths
Accidental deaths in Russia
Deaths by drowning
HC CSKA Moscow players
Ice hockey players at the 1964 Winter Olympics
Ice hockey players at the 1968 Winter Olympics
Ice hockey players at the 1972 Winter Olympics
IIHF Hall of Fame inductees
Olympic ice hockey players of the Soviet Union
Olympic gold medalists for the Soviet Union
Ice hockey people from Moscow
Soviet ice hockey defencemen
Olympic medalists in ice hockey
Medalists at the 1964 Winter Olympics
Medalists at the 1972 Winter Olympics
Medalists at the 1968 Winter Olympics